Songs on My Sleeve is the debut studio album by Australian singer Caitlyn Shadbolt. The album was announced on 17 March 2017, alongside the lead single "My Breakup Anthem". The album was released on 26 May 2017.

Shadbolt explained the title, saying "I decided to call this album Songs on My Sleeve because I have co-written every track. And as a songwriter, each song starts from something personal. When I listen to this album now, it's like I'm going back through my diary and reading all the memories and moments over the last two years."

Track listing

Charts

Release history

References

2017 debut albums
Caitlyn Shadbolt albums